William Taylor (c. 1870 – 23 July 1949) was a Scottish footballer who played as an outside right for Heart of Midlothian, Blackburn Rovers, Leith Athletic and the Scottish national team.

Taylor finished as the top scorer in Scottish Football League Division One in the 1896–97 season with 12 goals as Hearts won the championship. He also won the Scottish Cup with the Edinburgh club in 1891 and 1896, but only played once in their other title-winning campaign of 1894–95.

References

1949 deaths
Blackburn Rovers F.C. players
Heart of Midlothian F.C. players
Scotland international footballers
Scottish Junior Football Association players
Scottish Football League players
English Football League players
Scottish footballers
Footballers from Edinburgh
Year of birth uncertain
Leith Athletic F.C. players
Association football outside forwards
Scottish league football top scorers